Luvuyo Nkese (born 6 May 1997) is a South African cricketer. He made his Twenty20 debut for Northerns in the 2017 Africa T20 Cup on 1 September 2017. He made his first-class debut for Northerns in the 2017–18 Sunfoil 3-Day Cup on 12 October 2017. He made his List A debut for Northerns in the 2017–18 CSA Provincial One-Day Challenge on 15 October 2017.

He was the leading wicket-taker in the 2017–18 CSA Provincial One-Day Challenge tournament for Northerns, with eleven dismissals in eight matches.

In September 2018, he was named in Northerns' squad for the 2018 Africa T20 Cup.

References

External links
 

1997 births
Living people
South African cricketers
Northerns cricketers
Place of birth missing (living people)